Ivan Šubašić (7 May 1892 – 22 March 1955) was a Yugoslav Croat politician, best known as the last Ban of Croatia and prime minister of the royalist Yugoslav Government in exile during the Second World War.

Early life
He was born in Vukova Gorica, then he lived in Austria-Hungary. He finished grammar and high school in Zagreb, and enrolled onto the Faculty of Theology at the University of Zagreb. During the First World War, he was drafted into Austro-Hungarian Army where he took part in the fighting against Serbian forces on the Drina River. Later he was sent to the Eastern Front where he used the opportunity to defect to the Russians. From there he joined the Yugoslav volunteers fighting within the Serbian army on the Salonica front.

After the war, Šubašić gained his law degree at University of Zagreb, Faculty of Law, and after that, he opened a law office in Vrbovsko. There he met Vladko Maček and joined the Croatian Peasant Party. In 1938, he was elected to the Yugoslav National Assembly.

Political career

Ban of Croatia
In August 1939, Maček and Yugoslav Prime Minister Dragiša Cvetković reached the deal about the constitutional reconstruction of Yugoslavia and restoration of Croatian statehood in the form of Banovina of Croatia—an autonomous entity which, together with Croatia proper, included large sections of today's Bosnia-Herzegovina and some sections of today's Vojvodina, which contained an ethnic Croat majority. Šubašić was appointed as the first ban, or titular head of this entity, in charge of its government.

The Banovina came to an end together with Kingdom of Yugoslavia, following the invasion by Axis powers in April 1941. Šubašić joined Dušan Simović and his Yugoslav government-in-exile.

Government-in-exile
In emigration, Šubašić first represented the Yugoslav royal government in the United States. Gradually, the widening gap between the royalist government and Yugoslav major resistance movement embodied in Tito and his Communist-dominated Partisans forced Winston Churchill to mediate. Šubašić, a non-Communist Croat, was appointed as the new prime minister in order to reach a compromise between Tito—whose forces represented the de facto government on liberated territories—and the monarchy, which preferred Draža Mihailović and his Serb-dominated Chetniks.

After publicly rejecting Mihailović, Šubašić met with Tito on the island of Vis and signed the Tito–Šubašić agreement, which recognised the Partisans as the legitimate armed forces of Yugoslavia in exchange for Partisans formally recognising and taking part in the new government. Šubašić kept his post until 7 March 1945, when Tito formally became the prime minister of Yugoslavia. Šubašić was foreign minister in his cabinet until October, when he resigned, disagreeing with Communist policies of new government.

Later life and death
Šubašić spent the remainder of his life away from the spotlight, dying in 1955 in Zagreb. About 10,000 people attended his funeral. He is buried in Mirogoj Cemetery.

References

Notes

1892 births
1955 deaths
People from Netretić
People from the Kingdom of Croatia-Slavonia
Croatian Roman Catholics
Croatian Peasant Party politicians
Prime Ministers of Yugoslavia
Representatives in the Yugoslav National Assembly (1921–1941)
Bans of Croatia
Bans of the Kingdom of Yugoslavia
Croatian people of World War II
World War II political leaders
Yugoslavism
Burials at Mirogoj Cemetery